Banksia fililoba is a species of shrub that is endemic to Western Australia. It has pinnatipartite leaves with sharply pointed lobes, heads of up to eighty yellowish flowers and egg-shaped fruit. It mainly grows in kwongan in the south-west of the state.

Description
Banksia fililoba is a tangled shrub that typically grows to a height of  but does not form a lignotuber. The flowers are borne on a head containing between fifty-five and eighty flowers in each head.

Taxonomy and naming
This banksia was first formally described in 1996 by Alex George in the journal Nuytsia from specimens he collected near Lake Grace, and given the name Dryandra fililoba. In 2007, Austin Mast and Kevin Thiele transferred all the dryandras to the genus Banksia and this species became Banksia fililoba. The specific epithet (fililoba) is from Latin words meaning "a thread" and "a lobe" referring to the fine lobes of the leaves.

Distribution and habitat
Banksia fililoba grows in kwongan, sometimes in wandoo woodland, between Woodanilling, Lake Grace and Harrismith in the Avon Wheatbelt and Mallee biogeographic regions.

Conservation status
This banksia is classified as "not threatened" by the Western Australian Government Department of Parks and Wildlife.

References

fililoba
Endemic flora of Western Australia
Plants described in 1996
Taxa named by Alex George
Taxa named by Kevin Thiele